Köln Frankfurter Straße is a station situated at Gremberghoven, Cologne in western Germany on the Cologne Airport Loop and the Cologne–Overath railway. It was opened with the Cologne Airport loop on 13 June 2004.

It is served by the S13 and the S19 services of the Rhine-Ruhr S-Bahn together run at 20-minute intervals on weekdays and every 30 minutes on the weekend. It is classified by Deutsche Bahn as a category 4 station.

References 

S13 (Rhine-Ruhr S-Bahn)
Railway stations in Cologne
Rhine-Ruhr S-Bahn stations
Railway stations in Germany opened in 2004